Johnathan is a given name. It is an alternative spelling of Jonathan or a combination of the names John and Jonathan. Notable people with the name include:

American football
Johnathan Abram (born 1996), American football player
Johnathan Gray (born 1993), American football running back
Johnathan Hankins (born 1992), American football defensive tackle 
Johnathan Joseph (born 1984), American football cornerback 
Johnathan Taylor (born 1979), American football defensive end

Association football
Johnathan Aparecido da Silva (born 1990), Brazilian football player
Johnathan Carlos Pereira (born 1995), Brazilian footballer

Basketball
Johnathan Loyd (born 1991), American professional basketball player
Johnathan Stove (born 1995), American basketball player for Hapoel Galil Elyon of the Israeli Basketball Premier League
Johnathan Williams (born 1995), American college basketball player

Other
Johnathan Porter (born 1997), American rapper known professionally as Blueface
Johnathan Thurston (born 1983), Australian professional rugby league footballer
Johnathan Wendel (born 1981), American former professional esports player

See also